Taratabong: The World of the Meloditties (original Italian:  Taratabong! Il Mondo dei Musicilli) is a cartoon produced and directed by Italian studio Toposodo, based on an idea by Marco Bigliazzi and Fabrizio Bondi, and distributed worldwide by Mediatoon. It is intended for children aged 2 to 4 years.

Taratabong is the world inhabited by the Meloditties, which are animated musical instruments.

Characters 
Main Characters
 Trumpee (a cute female trumpet - Snari’s sister)
 Snaree (a funny male snare drum - Trumpi's brother)
 Pino (a little sweet, bubbly, and friendly male upright toy piano - Trumpi and Snari’s best friend)
 Maestro Nomo (voiced by Frank Welker, a male metronome and the music teacher)
 Bone (a male trombone, father of Trumpi and Snari)
 Drumba (a female bass drum, mother of Trumpi and Snari)
 The Xylo brothers (individual keys on a xylophone)
 The great Grando (a male grand piano, father of Pino)
 The Narrator (voiced by Sharon Mann in English, a female narrator interacts with and talk to the Meloditties)

Supporting Characters
 Pipeorg (a male pipe organ)
 Barello (a male barrel organ)
 Trebass (a male double bass, Iolin’s dad)
 Mari and Bimba (marimbas)
 Chimeo (a female chimes)
 Rino (a female tambourine)
 Grandpa Tuba (a male Tuba, father of Bone)
 Fluto (a female in English or male in polish flute)
 Tymp and Tump, the timpani twins
 Iolin (a male violin)
 Tarrita (a female in English and male in polish girly girl guitar)
 Paco (a bass guitar, Electra’s cousin)
 Electra (a female tomboy electric guitar)
 Jo (a male banjo)
 Andolino (a male mandolin, Tarrita's cousin)
 Robo (a male in English and female in polish robot-shaped synthesizer)
 The Tchycapoon Tribe (a series of percussion instruments)
 Aunt Accordia (a female accordion)
 Penny (a female Penny whistle, or Tin Whistle)
 Professor Harpsy (a male Harpsichord)
 Lam, Ello and Phone (3 Jew's Harps)
 The Sax Brothers (a band of saxophones)
 Clari (a male clarinet)
 Clarence (a male bass clarinet)
 Ocarina (ocarina)
 Soon (a male scaredy-cat bassoon)
 Nola (a female bossy Pianola)
 Frenchi (a french horn)
 Tweeti (an English horn)
 Boe (a male oboe)
 Agatha (the female harp)
 Plate and Saucer (two cymbals, cousins of Trumpi and Snari)
 Gingh Gong (a giant gong)
 Viola (a viola, Iolin's mom)
 Cello (a cello, Iolin's older brother)
 Tom & Tim (a pair of tom-drums, Drumba's brothers)

List of episodes
 Grandpa Tuba / The Meloditty Big Band / A Strange Lesson / Drumba, We've Got Visitors
 Tarrita and Her Cousins / Ding Dong Bell / Big Voice, Little Voice / The Music of the Stars
 Taking Turns / Robo the Synthesizer / The Magic Carousel / Jump Up
 The Yawning Double Bass / The Off-Key Guitar / Follow the Beat / Musical Theater
 The Amazing Harp / The Horn Friends / The Pianola / Penny Among the Pumpkins
 Moonlight Sonata / Sound Patterns / Clary, the Chatterbox Clarinet / Professor Harpsy
 Lamellophones / The Tympani Twins / Ghing Gong / What Soon, the Bassoon, Saw
 Megaphone and Microphone / A Bad Day in Taratabong / Giant Pipeorg / Party Time in the Forest
 Paco, the Electric Bass / Taperee Remembers / Practice Makes Perfect / The String Family
 The Mysterious Track / Splish Splash / Hide and Go Seek ... the Echo / Happy Birthday!
 The Meloditties / Where's Do? / The Bum Note / The Way to School
 Soft and Loud / Wind Song / Carnival Time / Happy and Sad
 Here Not There / The Sax Brothers / Shy Fluto / A Quiet Winter

External links
 IMDB Entry
 TV.com entry

Italian children's animated television series